Google Web Server (GWS) is proprietary web server software that Google uses for its web infrastructure. GWS is used exclusively inside Google's ecosystem for website hosting.

In 2008 GWS team was led by  Bharat Mediratta. GWS is sometimes described as one of the most guarded components of Google's infrastructure.

In 2010 GWS was reported as serving 13% of all web sites in the world.
In May, 2015, GWS was ranked as the fourth most popular web server on the internet after Apache, nginx and Microsoft IIS, powering an estimated 7.95% of active websites. Web page requests on most Google pages provide "gws" (without a version number) in the HTTP header as an indication of the web server software being used.

Information regarding GWS is scarce. In a blog post from Google's Chicago office in 2011, Google provided some details on GWS:

See also
 gLinux

References

Web Server
Web Server
Unix network-related software
Web server software
Web server software for Linux